Ilytheomyces is a genus of fungi in the family Laboulbeniaceae. The genus contain 15 species.

References

External links
Ilytheomyces at Index Fungorum

Laboulbeniaceae
Laboulbeniales genera